Dennis Rasmussen may refer to: 
Dennis Rasmussen (baseball) (born 1959), an American former MLB player
Dennis Rasmussen (ice hockey) (born 1990), Swedish NHL player
Dennis F. Rasmussen  (born 1947), American politician

See also
 Rasmussen (disambiguation)